El Cielo Rojo is a 2008 independent film from Costa Rica. Written and directed by Miguel Alejandro Gomez, the film stars Allan Obando (Roberto), Mauricio Dapena (Berny), Ricardo Rodriguez (Manuel), and Edgar Roman (Nestor).

The film was shot in the Costa Rican provinces of San José, Puntarenas, Guanacaste, and Alajuela; It was shot in 21 days through January 2007 and was released in early August 2008. The film is a character-driven drama, with a heavy dose of comedy, and could be classified as both a coming-of-age story with political undertones and an art-house film.

Synopsis 
Bernie, Manuel, and Nestor just graduated from high school, and have no plans for the future. Unsatisfied with the opportunities Costa Rica presents, the boys decide to concentrate on mundane activities. However, over the course of a few days, key events in the boys' personal lives conspire to make a disinterested lifestyle difficult.

After a break-up with his girlfriend, Bernie reconsiders going to college, in hopes of repairing his relationship. In the midst of an identity crisis brought on by concerned adults, Manuel tries to survive mental confusion.

Bound by revolutionary spirit, the friends must handle their internal conflicts individually and as a group.

Production 
El cielo rojo was filmed in several provinces of Costa Rica: San José, Puntarenas, Guanacaste and Alajuela; filming took 21 days in January 2007 and was released in early August 2008.

See also 
El Fin, a 2012 Gomez film

References

External links 
 
 

2008 films
2000s coming-of-age comedy-drama films
2008 independent films
Costa Rican comedy-drama films
Films set in Costa Rica
Films shot in Costa Rica